The black-lored yellowthroat (Geothlypis auricularis) is a New World warbler. It has a number of separate resident breeding populations in South America from western Ecuador to western Peru. It was previously considered a subspecies of the masked yellowthroat.

The breeding habitat is marshes and other wet areas with dense low vegetation.  

The black-lored yellowthroat is usually seen in pairs, and does not associate with other species. It is often skulking, but may pop up occasionally, especially to sing. It feeds on insects, including caterpillars, dragonflies, damselflies,
grasshoppers and beetles, and spiders, which are usually captured in dense vegetation. The call is a fast chattering, quite unlike that of other yellowthroat species, and a more typical sharp chip.

References

 New World Warblers by Curson, Quinn and Beadle, 
 Birds of Venezuela by Hilty, 

 A guide to the birds of Costa Rica by Stiles and Skutch 

Geothlypis
Birds of South America
Birds described in 1883
Taxa named by Osbert Salvin